Daniel Lecourtois (25 January 1902 – 16 January 1985) was a French film actor. He appeared in more than sixty films and television series during his career. In his later career he often played authority figures.

Partial filmography

 Misdeal (1928) - Un danseur (uncredited)
 Échec et mat (1931) - Robert Manoy
 Monsieur le maréchal (1931) - Le lieutenant Tradivot
My Aunt from Honfleur (1931)
 The Fortune (1931) - Badoureau / Studel
  (1932) - Jacques
 The Beautiful Adventure (1932) - André, their son
 The Agony of the Eagles (1933) - Le jeune aristocrate
 Madame Bovary (1934) - Leon
 Iris perdue et retrouvée (1934) - Maxime de Persani
 Coralie et Cie (1934)
 Song of Farewell (1934) - Franz Liszt
 Votre sourire (1934) - Monsieur Martin
 The Green Domino (1935) - Naulin
 La Garçonne (1936)
 Les Demi-vierges (1936) - Maxime de Chantel
 The Call of Life (1937) - Le docteur Lenoir
 Les filles du Rhône (1938)
 Golden Venus (1938) - André de Saint-Guillon
 La cité des lumières (1938)
 There's No Tomorrow (1939) - Dr. Armand Péreux
 Dreams of Love (1947) - Ronchaud
 Rendezvous in Paris (1947) - Le commissaire du bord
 The Man Who Returns from Afar (1950) - Le docteur Moutier
 Lost Souvenirs (1950) - Le directeur de l'hôtel
 The Man from Jamaica (1950) - Docteur Marc Heckart
 La Vérité sur Bébé Donge (1952) - Georges Donge
 Adorable Creatures (1952) - Jacques
 The Lottery of Happiness (1953)
 Alarm in Morocco (1953) - Le commandant
 Gamin de Paris (1954) - Georges Salvin
 The Possessors (1958) - Canet
 The Bear (1960) - Le directeur
 Don't Tempt the Devil (1963) - Un avocat
 The Train (1964) - Priest (uncredited)
 Comment épouser un premier ministre (1964)
 Elle boit pas, elle fume pas, elle drague pas, mais... elle cause ! (1970) - Brimeux
 The Breach (1970)
 Just Before Nightfall (1971) - Dorfmann
 Dr. Popaul (1972) - Prof. Dupont
 Wedding in Blood (1973) - Prefet / Department governor
 Stavisky (1974) - Le président de la commission d'enquête
 Verdict (1974) - Le procureur général
 Vincent, François, Paul and the Others (1974) - Georges
 Nada (1974)
 Judith Therpauve (1978) - Desfraizeaux

References

Bibliography
 Hayward, Susan. Simone Signoret: The Star as Cultural Sign. A&C Black, 2004.

External links

1902 births
1985 deaths
French male film actors
Male actors from Paris
20th-century French male actors